Jesse Howard (1885–1983) was an American artist known for his hand-lettered signs. A self-taught artist, Howard's first professional recognition came when Art in America magazine profiled him in 1968. Howard worked from what he called "Sorehead Hill", a 20-acre farm in Fulton, Missouri where he both produced and displayed his work.

His work is included in the collection of the Smithsonian American Art Museum, the American Folk Art Museum and the Metropolitan Museum of Art.

External links 

 Missouri Remembers Artist Portal

References

1885 births
1983 deaths
20th-century American artists
Artists from Missouri